The Pirai River may refer to:
 the Piray River in Bolivia
 the Piraí River (Paraná), a river of Paraná state in southern Brazil
 the Piraí River (Rio de Janeiro), a river of Rio de Janeiro state in southeastern Brazil
 the Piraí River (Santa Catarina), a river of Santa Catarina state in southeastern Brazil
 the Pirai River (India), a river of India